Chicago Christian High School or CCHS is a private Christian school in Palos Heights, Illinois.

External links

Christian schools in Illinois
Private high schools in Cook County, Illinois